Flo'Ology is the second and final studio album by the English R&B duo Floetry, released in the United States on 8 November 2005 by Geffen Records and in the United Kingdom on 14 November 2005 by Polydor Records. It debuted at number seven on the US Billboard 200 and spawned the single "SupaStar" featuring rapper Common. As of September 2010, the album has sold 363,000 in the United States.

Critical reception

Allmusic editor Rob Theakston found that Flo'Ology "rises to the top of the list as one of the best things the group has ever released. The blueprint pretty much stays the same: tasteful, funky neo-soul grooves blended with emotive R&B crooning and spoken word poetry. But there's a much-needed sense of refinement to their style and vocal delivery this time around, a hint of maturity that was lost on their debut and subsequent releases." Will Hermes of Entertainment Weekly called Flo'Ology "an elegant new set prioritizing the soul in their hip-hop/soul sound." The Guardians Caroline Sullivan wrote that the duo conquers "so well that what remains is complete mastery of studio technique but no fabulousness. Their unusual set-up (Ambrosius sings, Stewart raps) keeps things ticking over in a lively way, and Stewart's south-London flow can be a delight [...] But this is solid rather than stunning."

Track listing

Samples
"Blessed 2 Have" contains excerpts from Supertramp's "School" as written by Rick Davies and Roger Hodgson.

Charts

Weekly charts

Year-end charts

References

2005 albums
Albums produced by Raphael Saadiq
Albums produced by Scott Storch
Floetry albums
Geffen Records albums
Polydor Records albums